RNA 2',3'-cyclic phosphate and 5'-OH ligase is a protein that in humans is encoded by the RTCB gene. It is found in the stress granule of cells.

Structure 
, no crystal structure of the human RTCB is known, but homology models built from other RtcB-family ligases are available. The structure of Pyrococcus horikoshii RtcB, which uses GTP instead of ATP, shows two manganese (Mn2+) cofactors, and a mechanism involving a covalently linked GTP-histidine-RtcB intermediate. The residue involved, H404, is conserved in human RTCB as H428.

Function

Protein family 

RTCB belongs to the RtcB family of ATP-dependent RNA ligases, named after the eponymous protein in E. coli. The bacterial RtcB acts as a tRNA ligase, rejoining broken stem-loops in case of damage. It is also able to catalyse RNA splicing.

The eukaryotic homologs of RtcB, including the human RTCB protein, participates in the tRNA-splicing ligase complex.

References

Further reading

External links 
 MetaCyc: CPLX-9136: Homo sapiens tRNA-splicing ligase complex (GO:0072669)